Obruchevichthys is an extinct genus of tetrapod from Latvia during the Late Devonian. When the jawbone, the only known fossil of this creature, was uncovered in Latvia, it was mistaken as a lobe-fin fish. However, when it was analyzed, it proved to hold many similarities to Elginerpeton, from Scotland. It was then declared belonging to the earliest group of tetrapods.

References

External links
 Devonian Times article on Obruchevichthys gracilis
 Obruchevichthys gracilis and Elginerpeton at Palaeos.com

Further reading
 Gaining Ground: The Origin and Early Evolution of Tetrapods by Jennifer A. Clack
 Origins of the Higher Groups of Tetrapods: Controversy and Consensus by Hans-Peter Schultze and Linda Trueb
 Air-Breathing Fishes: Evolution, Diversity, and Adaptation by Jeffrey B. Graham

Prehistoric tetrapod genera
Transitional fossils
Devonian animals of Europe
Fossil taxa described in 1977
Fauna of Latvia
Ichthyostegalia
Frasnian genera